Jean Houde (born September 11, 1939) is a French sprint canoer who competed in the early 1960s. At the 1960 Summer Olympics in Rome, he was eliminated in the repechages of the K-1 4 × 500 m event.

References
Sports-reference.com profile

1939 births
Canoeists at the 1960 Summer Olympics
French male canoeists
Living people
Olympic canoeists of France
Place of birth missing (living people)
20th-century French people